The Second Hundred Years (a.k.a. The Second 100 Years) is a 1927 American silent comedy short film starring Stan Laurel and Oliver Hardy prior to their official billing as the duo Laurel and Hardy. The team appeared in a total of 107 films between 1921 and 1951.

Plot

Stan and Ollie play two convicts who share a cell. They dig a tunnel to escape from prison. After making a detour to avoid a burst underground water pipe, they emerge through the floor of the warden's office and are quickly sent back to the cell block after a short chase. Not long afterward, Stan and Ollie cleverly disguise themselves as painters and casually walk out through the prison's front gate during a meal break carrying paint cans and brushes. They are watched by a suspicious policeman, however. To keep the ruse going, they indiscriminately paint everything they see—including a parked car and its engine. After they accidentally paint the backside of a female passerby, the policeman pursues them. They climb into a limousine, eject the two backseat passengers, and steal their evening clothes. By happenstance, the men were two visiting French prison officials who were on their way to meet with the governor to learn about American prisons. Their chauffeur is unaware of the switch and he continues to his destination. Stan and Ollie assume the role of the French visitors and are taken to a banquet at the governor's home. While dining, Stan hilariously tries to corral a wayward cherry that has fallen from the top of his appetizer. When the banquet concludes, the governor escorts Stan and Ollie on a tour of the nearby prison. Their cell block comrades quickly recognize them—as do the real French dignitaries who are occupying Stan and Ollie's former cell in their underwear. After a brief chase, Stan and Ollie are marched back to their home behind bars.

Cast

Notes
Laurel and Hardy's heads were shaved for their appearance in this film; their hair had not yet grown back in their roles in Max Davidson's Call Of The Cuckoo (1927), released a week after The Second Hundred Years.
The Three Stooges would paint their prison uniforms black in 1941's So Long Mr. Chumps.

The Sons of the Desert
Chapters — called Tents — of The Sons of the Desert, the international Laurel and Hardy Appreciation Society, all take their names from L&H films; there is a The Second Hundred Years Tent on Long Island, New York.

References

External links 

 

1927 films
American silent short films
American black-and-white films
Films directed by Fred Guiol
Laurel and Hardy (film series)
American prison comedy films
1927 comedy films
Metro-Goldwyn-Mayer short films
Films with screenplays by H. M. Walker
1927 short films
American comedy short films
1920s American films
Silent American comedy films